Dayville is an unincorporated community in Anderson Township, Warrick County, in the U.S. state of Indiana.

History
A post office was established at Dayville in 1900, but was soon discontinued, in 1901. George O. Day served as postmaster, and gave the community his family name.

Geography

References

Unincorporated communities in Warrick County, Indiana
Unincorporated communities in Indiana